Svanvik Church is a parish church of the Church of Norway in Sør-Varanger Municipality in Troms og Finnmark county, Norway. It is located in the village of Svanvik in the Pasvikdalen valley, along the river Pasvikelva, right on the border with Russia. It is one of the churches for the Sør-Varanger parish which is part of the Varanger prosti (deanery) in the Diocese of Nord-Hålogaland. The wooden church was built in a cruciform style in 1934 by the architect Harald Sund. The church seats about 250 people.

The building was consecrated on 5 September 1934 after a long time when the people of the Pasvikdalen valley wanted their own place of worship. During World War II, the chapel was located right in the firing line during the Liberation of Finnmark, but it received only minor damage and it was quickly repaired after the war.

See also
List of churches in Nord-Hålogaland

References

Sør-Varanger
Churches in Finnmark
Wooden churches in Norway
Cruciform churches in Norway
20th-century Church of Norway church buildings
Churches completed in 1934
1934 establishments in Norway